Lisle station is a commuter railroad station along Metra's BNSF Line in Lisle, Illinois. The station is at 1000 Front Street,  from Union Station, the east end of the line. As of 2018, Lisle is the 10th busiest of Metra's 236 non-downtown stations, with an average of 1,895 weekday boardings. It is near the Village Hall on Burlington Avenue and the St. Joan of Arc School. Parking for the station is also available near these locations, as well as further east near St. Joseph Creek Road and as far north as Ogden Avenue. Amtrak trains pass through the station but do not stop.

Lisle station was originally built by the Chicago, Burlington and Quincy Railroad in 1864. A fire destroyed the first railroad depot, but it was rebuilt in 1874 by the CB&Q. Currently, the station has a much more contemporary appearance, and even contains a pedestrian tunnel.

References

External links

Metra stations in Illinois
Former Chicago, Burlington and Quincy Railroad stations
Railway stations in the United States opened in 1864
Lisle, Illinois
Railway stations in DuPage County, Illinois